This is a list of electoral results for the Electoral district of Buninyong in Victorian state elections.

Members for Buninyong

Election results

Elections in the 2010s

References

Victoria (Australia) state electoral results by district